The 1997 Grand Prix de Tennis de Toulouse was a men's tennis tournament played on indoor hard courts in Toulouse, France that was part of the World Series of the 1997 ATP Tour. It was the 16th edition of the tournament and was held from 22 September until 28 September 1997. Unseeded Nicolas Kiefer won the singles title.

Finals

Singles

 Nicolas Kiefer defeated  Mark Philippoussis, 7–5, 5–7, 6–4

Doubles

 Jacco Eltingh /  Paul Haarhuis defeated  Jean-Philippe Fleurian /  Max Mirnyi, 6–3, 7–6

References

External links
 ITF tournament edition details

Grand Prix de Tennis de Toulouse
Grand Prix de Tennis de Toulouse
Grand Prix de Tennis de Toulouse
Grand Prix de Tennis de Toulouse